Heo Jun (허준, 1539 – 9 October 1615) was a Korean physician. He was the royal chief physician of Naeuiwon during the reign of King Seonjo and King Gwanghae of the Joseon Dynasty in Korea.

Biography
Heo Jun was born in 1539 to an affluent military family. He was well educated and financially secure throughout his childhood. Although he belonged to a wealthy and respected household, he is thought to have faced discrimination from his lineage members and other aristocrats because he was born to a concubine. During the Joseon Dynasty Korea, illegitimate children of aristocrats could not maintain their fathers’ yangban or noble status and instead, were considered chungins. Chungins, or “middle people,” typically referred to technicians and administrators subordinate to yangbans. While Heo’s motivation to pursue medicine is unclear, his social status as a chungin may have prevented him from becoming a civil or military officer like his father.

He was appointed as a court physician at the age of 29.
In 1571, at age 32, Heo entered Naeuiwon, the royal clinic of Joseon. After that, he was continuously promoted within the clinic at an unprecedented rate. In 1575 Heo treated King Seonjo, the fourteenth king of Joseon, and rose to senior third rank1 government official position after curing the Crown Prince’s smallpox in 1590. The Imjin War, further solidified King Seonjo’s trust in Heo, who loyally accompanied the King throughout the war in contrast to other government officers who cowardly fled to protect their own lives. King Seonjo rewarded Heo’s allegiance and yet another successful treatment of the diseased Crown Prince by promoting him to the senior second rank in 1596. In 1600, Heo became the chief physician of Naeuiwon. During this time, King Seonjo ordered Heo to write a medical book for his citizens, who suffered from epidemics and post-war famines. He wanted to publish a book that promoted preventative care and detailed drug formulas and treatment methods that even uneducated commoners could easily comprehend and access. King Seonjo’s initiative is noted as one of the first public healthcare programs of Joseon.

In 1608 King Seonjo died. Government officials jealous of Heo’s illustrious career accused him of being culpable for the King’s death.  Heo was exiled to the countryside Ulju, where he continued to write the book. In 1609, King Gwanghaegun, the successor to Seonjo, restored Heo to office despite many officials’ disapproval. Like his father, Gwanghaegun appreciated Heo’s talent and loyalty. In 1610, Heo finally completed the twenty-five volumes of Donguibogam after fifteen years of continuous effort. He spent the last years of his life educating young physicians of Naeuiwon until he died in 1615. The title of senior first rank officer was conferred posthumously—an unprecedented feat that had long been hampered by yangban officials.

He wrote several medical texts, but his most significant achievement is Donguibogam. Donguibogam means “Mirror of Eastern Medicine”, which is often noted as the defining text of traditional Korean medicine. The work spread to East Asian countries like China, Japan, and Vietnam where it is still regarded as one of the classics of Oriental medicine today. It is divided into five chapters: Internal Medicine, External Medicine, Miscellaneous Diseases, Remedies, and Acupuncture. In the first chapter, Internal Medicine, Heo describes the interdependence of the liver, lung, kidney, heart, and spleen. The chapter on External Medicine explains how the skin, muscles, blood vessels, tendons, and bones allow for movement and maintenance of posture. The chapter on Miscellaneous Diseases describes various diseases' symptoms, diagnoses, and treatment methods. Heo’s remedies rely on medicinal herbs and plants, and he provides impressively detailed instructions on how to extract, maintain, and consume the herbs. The last chapter explicates acupuncture strategies. Donguibogam is one of the most valued treasures of Korea owing to its originality and quality. It provides valuable medical knowledge and also reflects the philosophy of seventeenth-century East Asia.

Although Heo Jun worked extensively with the royal family, he emphasized making treatment methods accessible and comprehensible to common people. Whereas common medical practice was to elevate the perceived value of treatment by using rare and expensive ingredients, he instead found natural herb remedies that were easily attainable by commoners in Korea and that was just as effective. Furthermore, he wrote the names of the herbs using the simple hangul letters instead of using more difficult hanja (Chinese characters), which most commoners did not understand.
As the backbone of Eastern medicine to this day, Donguibogam was recently included in UNESCO’s Memory of the World Register in 2009.

To this day, Heo Jun is revered as a brilliant physician and a loyal and compassionate person, who strived to develop accessible treatments for the poor and uneducated citizens.
Heo Jun's name and accomplishments are widely recognized by Koreans even today. Korean people still refer to Heo Jun's natural remedies found in his Dongui Bogam.

Family 
 Grandfather
 Heo Gon (허곤, 許琨) (경상도우수사)
 Father
 Heo Ryun (허륜)
 Mother
 Lady Gim of the Yeonggwang Gim clan (영광 김씨)
 Brothers
 Older half-brother: Heo Ok (허옥, 許沃)
 Younger half-brother: Heo Jing (허징, 許徵) (1549 - ?)
 Relatives
 Heo Bong (허봉, 許篈) (1551 - 1588)
 Heo Seong (허성, 許筬) (1548 - 1612)
 Nanseolheon, Lady Heo (난설헌 허씨, 蘭雪軒許氏) (1563 - 19 March 1589)
 Heo Gyun (허균, 許筠) (10 December 1569 - 12 October 1618)
 Wife
 Lady Gim of the Andong Gim clan (정경부인 안동 김씨)
 Son
 Heo Gyeom (허겸, 許謙) (파릉군, 巴陵君 )

In popular culture

Films and television
Portrayed by Kim Mu-saeng in the 1975 MBC TV series Jibnyeom.
Portrayed by Lee Soon-jae in the 1976 film Jibnyeom.
Portrayed by Seo In-seok in the 1991 MBC TV series Dongui Bogam.
Portrayed by Jun Kwang-ryul in the 1999-2000 MBC TV series Hur Jun.
Portrayed by Kim Joo-hyuk and Kang Han-byeol in the 2013 MBC TV series Hur Jun, the Original Story.
Portrayed by Yoon Shi-yoon and Kim Kap-soo in the 2016 JTBC TV series Mirror of the Witch.
Portrayed by Um Hyo-sup in the 2017 TVN TV series Live Up to Your Name, Dr. Heo.

Literature
The novel Dongui Bogam by Lee Eun-seong was published in 1990, and became a bestseller.

See also
Heojun Museum
Dongui Bogam
UNESCO's Memory of the World Programme

References

External links
Information about Heo Jun
Information about Korean Traditional Medicine

 
1530s births
1615 deaths
16th-century Korean physicians
16th-century Korean writers
17th-century Korean physicians
17th-century Korean writers
Court physicians
Heo clan of Yangcheon
Korean medical writers
People from Seoul
People of the Japanese invasions of Korea (1592–1598)